John Williams Calkin (11 October 1909, New Rochelle, New York – 5 August 1964, Westhampton, New York) was an American mathematician, specializing in functional analysis. The Calkin algebra is named after him.

Biography
Calkin received his bachelor's degree from Columbia University in 1933 and his master's degree in 1934 and Ph.D. in 1937 from Harvard University. His doctoral dissertation  Applications of the Theory of Hilbert Space to Partial Differential Equations; the Self-Adjoint Transformations in Hilbert Space Associated with a Formal Partial Differential Operator of the Second Order and Elliptic Type ) was supervised by Marshall H. Stone. In the dissertation, Calkin acknowledges useful discussions with John von Neumann. At the Institute for Advanced Study, Calkin was a research assistant for the academic year 1937–1938 (working with Oswald Veblen and von Neumann) and in the first eight months of 1942. From 1938 to 1942 he was an assistant professor at the University of New Hampshire and then at Chicago's Illinois Institute of Technology. During the late 1930s and early 1940s he wrote several important papers on operator theory and its applications to partial differential equations.

From Los Alamos, Calkin went in 1946 as a Guggenheim Fellow to the California Institute of Technology. He later taught at the Rice Institute (renamed Rice University in 1960), before he returned in 1949 to Los Alamos Scientific Laboratory as a member of the theoretical division. There he worked on the development of the H-bomb.

Upon his death he was survived by his widow, Emilienne Calkin (1922–2000), and his son, Brant Calkin (born 1934), from a previous marriage (to Eileen Calkin). Brant Calkin is an environmental activist in New Mexico and Utah and former president of the Sierra Club.

Selected publications

See also
 Calkin correspondence

References

20th-century American mathematicians
Columbia University alumni
Harvard University alumni
Manhattan Project people
Scientists from New Rochelle, New York
1909 births
1964 deaths
Mathematicians from New York (state)
University of New Hampshire faculty
Illinois Institute of Technology faculty
New York University faculty
Brookhaven National Laboratory staff
Los Alamos National Laboratory personnel
Rice University faculty
Operator theorists